Cresskill is a borough in Bergen County, in the U.S. state of New Jersey. As of the 2020 United States census, the borough's population was 9,155, an increase of 582 (+6.8%) from the 2010 census count of 8,573, which in turn reflected an increase of 827 (+10.7%) from the 7,746 counted in the 2000 census. This town got its name from "Cress", referring to the watercress that grew in its streams, and "Kill", referring to the stream passing through.

History
Cresskill was incorporated as a borough by an act of the New Jersey Legislature on May 8, 1894, from portions of Palisades Township. The borough was formed during the "Boroughitis" phenomenon then sweeping through Bergen County, in which 26 boroughs were formed in the county in 1894 alone. A portion of the borough was annexed by Alpine in 1904.

Railroads provided access from Cresskill to customers in New York City, including a chicken hatchery that was the world's largest by 1897. Railroad access established the former Camp Merritt as a major debarkation point for more than a million American troops being sent abroad to fight in World War I. To commemorate the fact, a large obelisk memorial (referred to by locals as "The Monument"), or "The Circle Monument" was dedicated in 1924, set in the center of the Camp Merritt Memorial Circle at the intersection of Madison Avenue and Knickerbocker Road (CR 505).

Historic sites
Sites in the borough listed on the National Register of Historic Places include:
 Blackledge-Gair House (at 111 Madison Avenue; added January 9, 1983)
 Demarest-Atwood House (at 84 Jefferson Avenue; added July 24, 1984)
 Peter Huyler House (50 County Road; added January 9, 1983)
 Benjamin P. Westervelt House (at 235 County Road; added January 9, 1983)

Geography
According to the United States Census Bureau, the borough had a total area of 2.07 square miles (5.36 km2), including 2.07 square miles (5.35 km2) of land and 0.01 square miles (0.01 km2) of water (0.24%).

It rests on land originally inhabited by the Munsee-Delaware.

The borough, a suburb of New York City, borders the Bergen County municipalities of Alpine, Bergenfield, Demarest, Dumont and Tenafly.

Demographics

2010 census

The Census Bureau's 2006–2010 American Community Survey showed that (in 2010 inflation-adjusted dollars) median household income was $105,625 (with a margin of error of +/− $14,945) and the median family income was $128,382 (+/− $16,732). Males had a median income of $95,795 (+/− $24,665) versus $72,188 (+/− $16,155) for females. The per capita income for the borough was $56,485 (+/− $6,202). About 2.4% of families and 4.0% of the population were below the poverty line, including 1.8% of those under age 18 and 9.4% of those age 65 or over.

2000 census
As of the 2000 United States census there were 7,746 people, 2,630 households, and 2,161 families residing in the borough. The population density was 3,625.9 people per square mile (1,397.5/km2). There were 2,702 housing units at an average density of 1,264.8 per square mile (487.5/km2). The racial makeup of the borough was 78.05% White, 0.92% African American, 0.04% Native American, 18.64% Asian, 0.65% from other races, and 1.70% from two or more races. Hispanic or Latino of any race were 3.99% of the population.

There were 2,630 households, out of which 40.6% had children under the age of 18 living with them, 71.1% were married couples living together, 8.5% had a female householder with no husband present, and 17.8% were non-families. 15.9% of all households were made up of individuals, and 9.7% had someone living alone who was 65 years of age or older. The average household size was 2.91 and the average family size was 3.26.

In the borough the age distribution of the population shows 26.3% under the age of 18, 4.7% from 18 to 24, 26.4% from 25 to 44, 25.7% from 45 to 64, and 16.9% who were 65 years of age or older. The median age was 41 years. For every 100 females, there were 92.7 males. For every 100 females age 18 and over, there were 88.2 males.

The median income for a household in the borough was $84,692, and the median income for a family was $96,245. Males had a median income of $61,194 versus $38,990 for females. The per capita income for the borough was $41,573. About 1.7% of families and 3.0% of the population were below the poverty line, including 3.7% of those under age 18 and 3.9% of those age 65 or over.

Government

Local government

Cresskill is governed under the Borough form of New Jersey municipal government, which is used in 218 municipalities (of the 564) statewide, making it the most common form of government in New Jersey. The governing body is comprised of the Mayor and the Borough Council, with all positions elected at-large on a partisan basis as part of the November general election. A Mayor is elected directly by the voters to a four-year term of office. The Borough Council is comprised of six members elected to serve three-year terms on a staggered basis, with two seats coming up for election each year in a three-year cycle. The Borough form of government used by Cresskill is a "weak mayor / strong council" government in which council members act as the legislative body with the mayor presiding at meetings and voting only in the event of a tie. The mayor can veto ordinances subject to an override by a two-thirds majority vote of the council. The mayor makes committee and liaison assignments for council members, and most appointments are made by the mayor with the advice and consent of the council.

, the Mayor of the Borough of Cresskill is Republican Benedict Romeo, whose term of office ends December 31, 2023. Members of the Cresskill Borough Council are James Cleary (R, 2023), Leslie Kaplan (D, 2025), Hector Olmo (R, 2023), Kathleen Savas (D, 2024), Kathy M. Schultz-Rummel (R, 2024) and Mark Spina (R, 2025).

Emergency services
Cresskill has a fire department on Madison Avenue. It is home to Engine 1, Engine 2, Engine 3, Ladder 1, and Rescue 1.

Cresskill also has an emergency medical services station, located next to the fire department on Madison Avenue.

Cresskill's police department is located at the borough hall on Union Avenue.

Federal, state, and county representation
Cresskill is located in the 5th Congressional District and is part of New Jersey's 37th state legislative district. 

Prior to the 2011 reapportionment following the 2010 Census, Cresskill had been in the 39th state legislative district. In redistricting following the 2010 census, which was in effect from 2013 to 2022, the borough was in the 9th congressional district.

Politics
As of March 2011, there were a total of 4,904 registered voters in Cresskill, of which 1,263 (25.8% vs. 31.7% countywide) were registered as Democrats, 1,234 (25.2% vs. 21.1%) were registered as Republicans and 2,403 (49.0% vs. 47.1%) were registered as Unaffiliated. There were 4 voters registered as Libertarians or Greens. Among the borough's 2010 Census population, 57.2% (vs. 57.1% in Bergen County) were registered to vote, including 78.1% of those ages 18 and over (vs. 73.7% countywide).

In the 2016 presidential election, Democrat Hillary Clinton received 2,086 votes (52.8% vs. 54.2% countywide), ahead of Republican Donald Trump with 1,689 votes (42.7% vs. 41.1% countywide) and other candidates with 127 votes (3.2% vs 3.0% countywide), among the 3,953 ballots cast by the borough's 5,467 registered voters for a turnout of 72.3% (vs. 73% in Bergen County). In the 2012 presidential election, Republican Mitt Romney received 1,805 votes (49.7% vs. 43.5% countywide), ahead of Democrat Barack Obama with 1,777 votes (48.9% vs. 54.8%) and other candidates with 22 votes (0.6% vs. 0.9%), among the 3,634 ballots cast by the borough's 5,163 registered voters, for a turnout of 70.4% (vs. 70.4% in Bergen County). In the 2008 presidential election, Democrat Barack Obama received 1,989 votes (50.4% vs. 53.9% countywide), ahead of Republican John McCain with 1,913 votes (48.5% vs. 44.5%) and other candidates with 23 votes (0.6% vs. 0.8%), among the 3,944 ballots cast by the borough's 5,074 registered voters, for a turnout of 77.7% (vs. 76.8% in Bergen County). In the 2004 presidential election, Republican George W. Bush received 1,886 votes (50.5% vs. 47.2% countywide), ahead of Democrat John Kerry with 1,813 votes (48.5% vs. 51.7%) and other candidates with 27 votes (0.7% vs. 0.7%), among the 3,738 ballots cast by the borough's 4,748 registered voters, for a turnout of 78.7% (vs. 76.9% in the whole county).

In the 2013 gubernatorial election, Republican Chris Christie received 64.3% of the vote (1,412 cast), ahead of Democrat Barbara Buono with 34.9% (766 votes), and other candidates with 0.9% (19 votes), among the 2,259 ballots cast by the borough's 4,949 registered voters (62 ballots were spoiled), for a turnout of 45.6%. In the 2009 gubernatorial election, Republican Chris Christie received 1,213 votes (49.5% vs. 45.8% countywide), ahead of Democrat Jon Corzine with 1,106 votes (45.2% vs. 48.0%), Independent Chris Daggett with 99 votes (4.0% vs. 4.7%) and other candidates with 8 votes (0.3% vs. 0.5%), among the 2,449 ballots cast by the borough's 4,975 registered voters, yielding a 49.2% turnout (vs. 50.0% in the county).

Education
The Cresskill Public Schools serve students in pre-kindergarten through twelfth grade. As of the 2018–19 school year, the district, comprised of four schools, had an enrollment of 1,790 students and 144.4 classroom teachers (on an FTE basis), for a student–teacher ratio of 12.4:1. Schools in the district (with 2018–19 enrollment data from the National Center for Education Statistics) are 
Edward H. Bryan School with 477 students grades Pre-K–5, 
Merritt Memorial School with 336 students in grades Pre-K–5, 
Cresskill Middle School with 426 in grades 6–8 and 
Cresskill High School with 541 students in grades 9–12.

Public school students from the borough, and all of Bergen County, are eligible to attend the secondary education programs offered by the Bergen County Technical Schools, which include the Bergen County Academies in Hackensack, and the Bergen Tech campus in Teterboro or Paramus. The district offers programs on a shared-time or full-time basis, with admission based on a selective application process and tuition covered by the student's home school district.

The Academy of Saint Therese of Lisieux, which opened in 1957, has 225 students in preschool through eighth grade and operates under the supervision of the Roman Catholic Archdiocese of Newark.

Transportation

Roads and highways

County Route 505 and County Route 501 travel through Cresskill.

Public transportation
The NJ Transit 166 bus route provides service to the Port Authority Bus Terminal in Midtown Manhattan, and local service is available on the 753 route.

Bus service to Rockland County and the Port Authority Bus Terminal in NYC is also provided by Rockland Coaches routes 14 and 20/20T.

Saddle River Tours / Ameribus provides rush hour service to the George Washington Bridge Bus Station on the 20/84 route.

Notable people

People who were born in, residents of, or otherwise closely associated with Cresskill include:

 Roger Ailes (1940–2017), television executive who was the chairman and CEO of Fox News and Fox Television Stations
 Joe Azelby (born 1962), professional football player who played for the Buffalo Bills, businessman and author
 Mary J. Blige (born 1971), R&B singer
 David Broza (born 1955), Israeli singer-songwriter
 Rick Cerone (born 1954), former catcher for the New York Yankees
 Lynn Chen (born 1976), actress, who has appeared on All My Children
 Halim El-Dabh (1921–2017), Egyptian-born composer who made Cresskill his home in the early 1960s
 Stephen Dadaian (born 1987), electric and classical guitarist
 Johnny Damon (born 1973), former left fielder for the New York Yankees
 Marvin Kaplan, lawyer and government official who serves as the Chairman of the National Labor Relations Board
 Michael Kempner (born 1958), founder, President, and CEO of the public relations firm MWW
 Andrew M. Luger (born 1959), attorney who served as the United States Attorney for the District of Minnesota from 2014 to 2017
 Betsy Markey (born 1956), member of the U.S. House of Representatives from Colorado
 Harold Martin (1918–2010), member of the New Jersey General Assembly
 Reuben (1912–1994) and Rose (1916–2006) Mattus, entrepreneurs and philanthropists who founded the Häagen-Dazs ice cream business
 Pierre McGuire (born 1961), ice hockey analyst and former NHL coach and scout
 May McNeer (1902–1994), journalist and author 
 Robert Bruce Merrifield (1921–2006), biochemist and winner of 1984 Nobel Prize in Chemistry
 Sherrill Milnes (born 1935), operatic baritone
 Tracy Morgan (born 1968), actor and comedian best known for his eight seasons as a cast member on Saturday Night Live and for his role as Tracy Jordan on the TV series 30 Rock
 Nicholas Oresko (1917–2013), United States Army veteran who was awarded the Medal of Honor for his actions on January 23, 1945, during World War II
 Mike Piazza (born 1968), former catcher for the New York Mets
 John Ricco (born ), assistant general manager of the New York Mets
 Tom Rinaldi, reporter for ESPN and ABC
 Ani Sarkisian (born 1995), footballer who plays as a forward for the Armenia women's national team
 Tommy Savas (born 1984), actor and producer
 Richard H. Tedford (–2011), paleontologist
 Lynd Ward (1905–1985), artist and storyteller, known for his series of wordless novels using wood engraving
 Gary Wright (born 1943), singer best known for his song "Dream Weaver"
 Robert Zoellner (1932–2014), investor and stamp collector who was the second person to have assembled a complete collection of United States postage stamps

References

Sources 
 Clayton, W. Woodford; and Nelson, William. History of Bergen and Passaic Counties, New Jersey, with Biographical Sketches of Many of its Pioneers and Prominent Men., Philadelphia: Everts and Peck, 1882.
 Harvey, Cornelius Burnham (ed.), Genealogical History of Hudson and Bergen Counties, New Jersey. New York: New Jersey Genealogical Publishing Co., 1900.
 Van Valen, James M. History of Bergen County, New Jersey. New York: New Jersey Publishing and Engraving Co., 1900.
 Westervelt, Frances A. (Frances Augusta), 1858–1942, History of Bergen County, New Jersey, 1630–1923, Lewis Historical Publishing Company, 1923.
 Municipal Incorporations of the State of New Jersey (according to Counties) prepared by the Division of Local Government, Department of the Treasury (New Jersey); December 1, 1958.

External links

 Cresskill official website

 
1894 establishments in New Jersey
Borough form of New Jersey government
Boroughs in Bergen County, New Jersey
Populated places established in 1894